Simon Eine (8 August 1936 – 30 September 2020) was a French actor. He studied at CNSAD under the direction of Jean Yonnel. He was once honorary secretary of the Comédie-Française.

Filmography

Cinema
Le Roi Lear (1965)
Au théâtre ce soir (1968)
Les Stances à Sophie (1971)
Another Man, Another Chance (1977)
The Reader (1988)
Catherene de Médicis (1988)
L'Autrichienne (1989)
Jeanne d'Arc (1989)
Les Hordes (1990)
RSVP (1992)
Descente aux enfers (1992)
Fin de droit (1992)
La Nuit du destin (1997)
Duval (1999)
Une nouvelle vie (1999)
La Mort oubliée (1999)
Largo Winch (2000)
Requiem (2001)
Notre musique (2003)
Le Tuteur (2003)
Sarah's Key (2010)
Celles qui aimaient Richard Wagner (2011)

Television
La Lumière noire
The Founding Boy (1980)
Nestor Burma (1993)
Les Interminables (2007)

Publications
Des étoiles plein les poches (2012)
Humeurs variables : Le sourire du babouin et autres nouvelles (2016)
Portraits d'Acteurs de la Comédie-Française (2019)

Decorations
Knight of the Legion of Honour (1997)
Officer of the Ordre national du Mérite
Officer of the Ordre des Arts et des Lettres

Awards
1st Prize of Modern Comedy for his role as Brutus in Julius Caesar (1960)
2nd Prize of Classical Comedy for his role of Alceste in The Misanthrope (1960)
2nd Prize of Tragedy for his role of Titus in Bérénice (1960)

References

1936 births
2020 deaths
Chevaliers of the Légion d'honneur
French male actors
Officers of the Ordre national du Mérite
Officiers of the Ordre des Arts et des Lettres